"D-I-V-O-R-C-E" is a song written by Bobby Braddock and Curly Putman, and recorded by American country music artist Tammy Wynette. It was released in May 1968 as the first single and title track from the album D-I-V-O-R-C-E.  Wynette's version was a number one country hit in 1968 and earned her a Grammy nomination for Best Country Vocal Performance, Female.

Background
Just a year after Wynette scored her first hit with "Your Good Girl's Gonna Go Bad," she had already gained a reputation for catering to the female perspective in country music that, according to country music writer Kurt Wolff, audiences badly craved. Her repertoire already included songs that urged understanding and forgiveness, but critics noted she had also become adept at singing songs of heartbreak. In Wolff's words, "(W)hen the end of the road was reached, she also spoke plainly of the hard issues facing modern-day couples."

Recorded in 1968, "D-I-V-O-R-C-E" is a woman's perspective on the impending collapse of her marriage. The song's title is an old parenting trick of spelling out words mothers and fathers hope their young children will not understand, they (the children) being not yet able to spell or comprehend the word's meaning. In this case, the soon-to-be-divorcee spells out words such as "divorce", "Joe" (the name of the woman's four-year-old son), "hell", and "custody" to shield the young, carefree boy from the cruel, harsh realities of the world surrounding him and the ultimate breakup of his mother and father.

Country music historian Bill Malone wrote that Wynette's own tumultuous life (five marriages) "encompassed the jagged reality so many women have faced." Therefore, he asserts that Wynette identified so well with "D-I-V-O-R-C-E"; her rendition, Malone wrote, is "painfully sincere—there is no irony here—and if there is a soap opera quality to the dialogue, the content well mirrors both her own life and contemporary experience."

Wolff, meanwhile, hailed the song as "tearjerking as any country song before or since. It approaches parody, but stops just short thanks to the sincerity of Tammy's quivering voice."

Chart performance
"D-I-V-O-R-C-E" was released in May 1968, and was one of Wynette's fastest-climbing songs to that time. It reached number one on the Billboard Hot Country Singles chart that June, and was also a minor pop hit, stopping at No. 63 on the Billboard Hot 100.

In 1975, a Tammy Wynette greatest hits album was released in the UK. Two of the songs from this album ascended the British pop chart that year, with "Stand by Your Man" reaching the top of the chart in April and "D-I-V-O-R-C-E" climbing to a peak position of No. 12 in July

Cover versions 
 Hour Glass for their album Hour Glass (1967)
 Dottie West for her album Feminine Fancy (1968)
 Liz Anderson for her album Like A Merry Go Round (1968)
 Norma Jean for her album Love's A Woman's Job (1968)
 Dolly Parton for her album In the Good Old Days (1969)
 Peggy Little for her album A Little Bit of Peggy (1969)
 Wanda Jackson on her first live album Live in Person at Mr. Lucky's (1969)
 Rosanne Cash on the 1998 tribute album Tammy Wynette Remembered (sung on the television special for the album by Lynn Anderson). 
 Melinda Schneider and Beccy Cole covered the song on their album Great Women of Country (2014).
 Circle Jerks for their album Golden Shower of Hits (1983) (in medley "Jerks on 45")

Use in media
 The original Tammy Wynette recording features in the films Five Easy Pieces (1970) and Wynette's 1973 re-recording of the song (which originally appeared on her Kids Say the Darndest Things (1973) album) appeared in Brokeback Mountain (2005).
 The song is featured in the re-release version of the video game Grand Theft Auto V as part of the Rebel Radio radio station.

Parodies
B.A.C.O.N and E.G.G.S was performed primarily by Homer and Jethro.
R.E.F.E.R.E.E. was written and sung by Max Boyce, as a response to a controversial refereeing decision in the 1974 Five Nations match between England and Wales at Twickenham.
A comic version sung by Scottish comedian Billy Connolly, with a dog in place of the little boy in the lyrics and spelt out words such as vet and quarantine, was a No. 1 hit in the UK in November 1975.
The musical number "U.N.C.O.U.P.L.E.D." from the musical Starlight Express also pastiches "D-I-V-O-R-C-E".
The Circle Jerks (a punk rock group from Southern California) released a medley of pop songs in 1983 entitled Golden Shower of Hits that includes the first verse and chorus of "D-I-V-O-R-C-E".
At the 2009 CMA Awards, co-hosts Brad Paisley and Carrie Underwood parodied the song in response to the recent news that country music duo Brooks & Dunn was splitting.

References

1968 singles
Tammy Wynette songs
Songs written by Bobby Braddock
Songs written by Curly Putman
Epic Records singles
1968 songs
Songs about divorce